DIME DETROIT (Detroit Institute of Music Education) is a for-profit college based in Detroit, Michigan. DIME DETROIT opened in the Fall of 2014 and the initial tuition for the entire 3-year BA program was $39,000. DIME offers bachelor's degrees in Commercial Music Performance (Guitar Bass, Drums, Vocals), Commercial Songwriting, and Music Industry Studies. DIME initially partnered with Falmouth University to validate its bachelor's degrees. In March 2016 a partnership with Metropolitan State University was announced that allows DIME students to be eligible for federal student aid. This partnership ended in March 2020.  DIME is now partnered with Oakland University in Michigan, and allows DIME students to receive BA degrees through Oakland University.  DIME students are students of Oakland University, and therefore pay the same tuition rate as OU students, and have access to all services that OU students have access too, as well as DIME's facility and faculty in downtown Detroit. 
In 2016, they opened their second campus DIME Denver, based in the Santa Fe Arts District. On March 16, 2020, MSU notified DIME and the DIME students that they were ending the partnership between the two colleges. The DIME founders claim that MSU Denver “voluntarily breached” their agreement by refusing to adhere to the 360-day notice period of termination. In a statement they stated, “On March 16th 2020, as the COVID 19 lockdown began, and without prior notice to DIME Directors or senior management, Metropolitan State University of Denver unilaterally announced by email to all DIME students and faculty that they were ending the MSU Denver at DIME partnership agreement." Later that same year, DIME reopened with a new partnership with Oakland University. DIME was founded by Kevin Nixon and Sarah Clayman. The Beringea Group invested 3 million dollars in DIME to help it open. Prior to founding DIME, Nixon and Clayman founded and managed the for-profit Brighton Institute of Modern Music.

References

External links
DIME Detroit website

For-profit universities and colleges in the United States
2014 establishments in Michigan
Educational institutions established in 2014